Rodil Vaquilar Zalameda (born August 2, 1963) is an associate justice of the Supreme Court of the Philippines. He was appointed by President Rodrigo Duterte replacing Associate Justice Mariano del Castillo.

Education 

He took his Bachelor of Laws (LL.B) at the Ateneo Law School in 1987 and passed the bar exam in 1988.

Career 
After passing the bar, Zalameda worked in the Makati Regional Trial Court as a clerk for two years. He then practiced privately until returning to government service in 1995 as a prosecutor in Mandaluyong City. He became assistant city prosecutor in 1997 and city prosecutor in 2002. He served in the position until his appointment to the Court of Appeals of the Philippines on September 5, 2008.

Supreme Court appointment 

In August 2019 CA Associate Justice Zalameda was appointed by President Rodrigo Duterte as Associate Justice of the Supreme Court to replace Associate Justice Mariano del Castillo who retired last July 29, 2019. He is the first Supreme Court appointee who took a decision writing exam in addition to interview conducted by the Judicial and Bar Council.

References 

1963 births
Living people
Associate Justices of the Supreme Court of the Philippines
Justices of the Court of Appeals of the Philippines
20th-century Filipino lawyers
21st-century Filipino judges
Ateneo de Manila University alumni